Manuel Enrique Guevara Reydtler (born July 15, 1969 in Villa de Cura, Aragua) is a retired professional road cyclist from Venezuela. He twice competed for his native country at the Summer Olympics, in 1996 and 2000.

Career

1991
1st Stage 12 Vuelta al Táchira
1999
1st  National Road Race Championships
1st Stages 5b & 13 Vuelta a Venezuela
2001
1st in Stage 3 Vuelta al Táchira
1st Overall Vuelta a la Independencia Nacional
1st Stages 3, 4 & 8
2002
1st Overall Doble Sucre Potosí GP Cemento Fancesa
1st Stage 9 Vuelta al Táchira
2003
1st in Stage 4 Vuelta al Táchira, Santa Ana (VEN)
2004
1st  Pan American Road Race Championships
2005
1st Stage 1 Vuelta al Táchira

References
 
Venezuelan cyclists

1969 births
Living people
People from Aragua
Venezuelan male cyclists
Vuelta a Venezuela stage winners
Cyclists at the 1996 Summer Olympics
Cyclists at the 2000 Summer Olympics
Cyclists at the 1999 Pan American Games
Olympic cyclists of Venezuela
Pan American Games competitors for Venezuela
21st-century Venezuelan people